Robert Howard Mallon (April 7, 1919 - September 10, 2008) was an American actor.

Early life
He was born in Greybull, Wyoming.

Career
Mallon was known for playing Bobby in 13 of the Our Gang/Little Rascals series of movies produced by Hal Roach.

He left show business after being "retired" from the Gang in 1932.

Death
He died on September 10, 2008, in Los Angeles, California, and was one of the last surviving members of the famed Little Rascals series at the time of his death. 

He is buried at the Mount Sinai Simi Valley Cemetery in Simi Valley, CA.

Filmography
 Love My Dog (1926, short) as kid warning the gang about the dogcatcher
 Tired Business Men (1927, short) as Bobby (credited as Hal Roach's Rascals)
 Chicken Feed (1927, short) as audience member
 Boxing Gloves (1929, short) as announcer Graham McCracker
 Bouncing Babies (1929, short) as kid listening to Farina (uncredited)
 Moan & Groan, Inc. (1929, short) as Bobby (credited as Hal Roach's Rascals)
 Shivering Shakespeare (1929, short) as shepherd/guard (uncredited)
 Teacher's Pet (1930, short) as student (uncredited)
 School's Out (1930, short)
 Blood and Thunder (1931, short) as kid at rehearsal (uncredited)  
 Spanky (1932, short) as rowdy kid in audience
 Free Wheeling (1932, short) as kid paddled by taxi driver
 Birthday Blues (1932, short)

Notable quotes

"Well, I don't know, but I think he should have been hauling water to the fire!" - Bobby in School's Out (Answering Miss Crabtree's question, "What was Nero doing while Rome burned?")
 "Well, he's my pal!" - Bobby in Birthday Blues

20th-century American male actors
1919 births
2008 deaths
Our Gang